General elections were held in Bolivia on 6 June 1993. As no candidate for the presidency received over 50% of the vote, the National Congress was required to elect a president on 4 August. Gonzalo Sánchez de Lozada of the MNR-MRTKL alliance was subsequently elected unopposed.

Campaign
Prior to the elections, the Revolutionary Left Movement (MIR) of incumbent Jaime Paz Zamora and the Nationalist Democratic Action (ADN) of ex-president Hugo Banzer formed the Patriotic Accord (AP) alliance. Hugo Banzer, in his fifth bid for the presidency, was presented as the Patriotic Accord's candidate in the election.

Banzer's primary opponent was the returning Revolutionary Nationalist Movement (MNR) candidate Gonzalo Sánchez de Lozada. The MNR's alliance with the Revolutionary Liberation Movement Tupaq Katari (MRTKL) saw Víctor Hugo Cárdenas, an indigenous Aymara, chosen as Sánchez de Lozada's running mate in an attempt to appeal to Bolivia's indigenous population.

The AP was faced with the negative image of corruption faced by Paz Zamora's government and the defensive campaign of Hugo Banzer. Two factors which made the MNR the clear front runner to win the election.

The campaign also saw the emergence of the "neo-populist" Max Fernández and Carlos Palenque candidates who drew the support of sector of the population discontented with the mainstream political parties. Palenque of Conscience of Fatherland (CONDEPA), in his second run, campaigned on a platform of returning to the ideals of the 1952 National Revolution.  Solidarity Civic Unity (UCS), in the party's first presidential run, presented Max Fernández.

Prior to the elections the Nationalist Democratic Action and Revolutionary Left Movement parties formed the Patriotic Accord alliance, whilst eight left-wing parties continued the United Left coalition.

A total of 14 candidates were presented for the presidential election.

Results
Gonzalo Sánchez de Lozada won the popular vote by 35.56% to Hugo Banzer's 21.05%. The CONDEPA and UCS candidates won a similar number of votes with a 0.52% difference between Max Fernández and Carlos Palenque. The remaining 10 candidates won 15.34% of the vote between them.

By department

Congressional ballot
On 6 August 1993, the National Congress convened to elect the president. Gonzalo Sánchez de Lozada was the only candidate voted on, and was supported by his MNR-MRTKL alliance as well as the UCS and MBL. All others parties abstained from voting. Gonzalo Sánchez de Lozada was elected president while Víctor Hugo Cárdenas became Bolivia's first indigenous vice president.

See also 
Bolivian National Congress, 1993–1997

Notes

References

Bibliography

 

1993 in Bolivia
Elections in Bolivia
Bolivia
Presidential elections in Bolivia